Evrenli is a village in the Mersin Province, Turkey. It is part of Toroslar district (a part of Greater Mersin). The population of the village was 225  as of 2012.

References

Villages in Toroslar District